Jon Rua (born Jonathan Rua, August 14, 1983) is an American actor, singer, and choreographer, best known for his roles in Broadway musicals such as Hamilton, In the Heights, and Hands on a Hardbody.

Rua was the choreographer for the 2016 Muny production of Aida in St. Louis, and a creative consultant for the 2016 musical SpongeBob SquarePants, joining its Broadway cast in 2017.

Early life 
Rua was born in Elizabeth, New Jersey and grew up in nearby Linden. His parents, Maria Nohelia Castañeda Cano and Elibanier "Marco" Rua, were both immigrants from Colombia.

Rua graduated in 2001 from Linden High School, where he participated in the musical theatre program and began dancing socially. He received a B.A. in Communication and Public Relations from Rutgers University. During Rua's college years, he attended his first dance class, and later started teaching dancing to younger students.

Career 
After college, Rua joined a dance company as an unpaid commitment, and eventually became a professional dancer doing live performance, music video work, and dancing for concerts. He then transitioned into musical theatre and acting.

Rua made his Broadway debut in 2008 as a swing in Lin-Manuel Miranda's musical In the Heights, later becoming the replacement for Sonny and Graffiti Pete. He stepped into the leading role of Usnavi several times as understudy.

As an original Broadway cast member of Hamilton in 2015, Rua originated the role of Charles Lee and performed in the ensemble. On December 20, 2015, Rua became the third performer to take on the title role of Alexander Hamilton on Broadway, as Miranda's understudy. Rua left Hamilton on June 29, 2016, and briefly returned in February 2017 as an alternate for Jevon McFerrin in the title role, after Javier Muñoz took temporary leave due to injury.

Rua has been a contributing choreographer for such projects as Hamilton, On Your Feet!, Flashdance, Hands on a Hardbody, Bring It On: The Musical, In the Heights, Insanity and NYCC's The Wiz. He has also been credited as a choreographer in productions in which he appeared as an actor. In 2014, Rua was a finalist for the Capezio Award for Choreographic Excellence.

His television credits include the role of Ricky in "Confessions", a 2016 episode of the CBS police procedural drama Blue Bloods. He also appeared in the televised version of the SpongeBob SquarePants: The Broadway Musical, which is currently on the Paramount+ streaming app.

Upcoming  Projects
Currently, Rua is working on a dance narrative written, choreographed, and performed by himself entitled, "Teenage Soul", has been commissioned by Milwaukee Rep and is planned to have public performances as early as 2023.
Rua is also the Choreographer for and actor in The Hombres at Two River Theater which is set to release in 2022.

Educator / Movement Director
Rua lives in New York City, where he teaches at the Broadway Dance Center.[14]
Outside of the Broadway Dance Center, Rua teaches dancers of all levels through workshops. Most recently Rua put on a dance workshop in 2021 as a Movement Director on the SS Neverender, a cruise for the band Coheed & Cambria, to the song In Keeping Secrets of Silent Earth 3. Rua also led an advanced hip hop workshop at BroadwayCon in 2016.

Other Choreographer / Assisting / Teaching Credits
 Hamilton as Assistant to the Choreographer
 Hands on a Hardbody as Assistant to the Choreographer
 FlashDance as Assistant to the Choreographer
 Bring It On The Musical as Assistant to the Choreographer
 The Wiz-NYCC as Assistant to the Choreographer
 In The Heights as Assistant to the Choreographer
 Insanity as Assistant to the Choreographer
 International Seminar of Dance as Assistant to the Choreographer as HipHop Instructor/Choreographer
 Genctur Youth Camp as Dance Instructor in Istanbul, Turkey

Awards and recognitions 
In 2016, Rua was nominated for an Astaire Award for Outstanding Ensemble in a Broadway Show for Hamilton, along with Carleigh Bettiol, Ariana Debose, Sydney James Harcourt, Sasha Hutchings, Thayne Jasperson, Emmy Raver-Lampman, Austin Smith, Seth Stewart, Betsy Struxness, and Ephraim Sykes.

Rua received a ceremonial plate for artistic achievements as a local native, presented by the mayor of Elizabeth, New Jersey during a July 8, 2016 appearance in the "Young Immigrant Hamilton Tour," part of the city's annual "CelebrateHAMILTON" program.

Other awards:
 2014 finalist for the Capezio Award for Choreographic Excellence
 2011 nominee for the Craig Noel Award for "Outstanding Lead Performance in a Play, Male" in Somewhere (Old Globe)
 2019 nominee Chita Rivera Awards for Film Nominations as Assistance Choreographer in "Isn't it Romantic"
 2018 nominee Fred Astaire Awards for Outstanding Ensemble in "Spongebob SquarePants" 
 2016 nominee Fred Astaire Awards for Outstanding Ensemble in "Hamilton"
 2016 Winner Tony Awards for Best Musical Theater Album for "Hamilton"
 2014 nominee Capezio A.C.E. Awards for Choreographic Excellence
 2011 nominee Craig Noel Awards for Excellence in Theatre Nomination for Leading Actor

Personal life
Rua lives in New York City, where he teaches at the Broadway Dance Center.

In 2021 Rua was a guest on the SS Neverender, a cruise for the band Coheed & Cambria, where he led choreography lessons for the cruise attendees to the song In Keeping Secrets of Silent Earth 3.

Performance credits

Theatrical performances

Broadway

Off-Broadway

Regional

Readings and workshops

Film

Television

Stage and concerts

Commercials and music videos

References 

1983 births
20th-century American male actors
21st-century American male actors
American male musical theatre actors
American people of Colombian descent
Linden High School (New Jersey) alumni
Living people
Male actors from New York City
American choreographers
Singers from New York City
Tony Award winners
Rutgers University alumni
American male dancers
People from Elizabeth, New Jersey
People from Linden, New Jersey